Rashidat Odun Sadiq (born 3 January 1981 in Ibadan) is a Nigerian women's basketball player. She played in the United States with the University of Connecticut Huskies and Oklahoma State Cowgirls. She also played with the Nigeria women's national basketball team at the 2004 Summer Olympics and the 2006 Commonwealth Games.

References

1981 births
Living people
African Games bronze medalists for Nigeria
African Games medalists in basketball
Basketball players at the 2004 Summer Olympics
Basketball players at the 2006 Commonwealth Games
Commonwealth Games competitors for Nigeria
Competitors at the 2011 All-Africa Games
Nigerian expatriate basketball people in the United States
Nigerian women's basketball players
Oklahoma State Cowgirls basketball players
Olympic basketball players of Nigeria
Sportspeople from Ibadan
UConn Huskies women's basketball players
Yoruba sportswomen
21st-century Nigerian women